BC Rasai is a professional Raseiniai, Lithuania basketball club, currently playing in National Basketball League.

Roster

Club achievements 
 2014-2015 season: NKL Round of 16

Notable players and coaches 
  Giedrius Kurtinaitis
  Karolis Guščikas

External links 

Raseiniai
Raseiniai
Basketball teams established in 2005
2005 establishments in Lithuania
National Basketball League (Lithuania) teams